The Happiest Man Alive was the fourth of five albums of home-made recordings, released by Stephen Jones under the name Baby Bird in 1996.

It was originally a limited edition release, but is now available as part of the 2002 CD box set The Original Lo-Fi. The album includes a version of the song "Candy Girl", subsequently a UK top-ten hit for Jones' band Babybird (written as one word).

Liner notes
All songs recorded on a 4-track tape recorder no bigger than a VCR. No Casio keyboards, no bellows-operated jazz synthesisers, no calor gas amplifiers have been used in these recordings. My attitude to resourcefulness-dictated-by-poverty never quite ran to stretching elastic bands over a washing-up bowl; though this technique, however tempting, is probably closer in spirit to Baby Bird than to musicianship.

The Happiest Man Alive is quality control on the grandest scale imaginable.

Critical reception

"...an oblique sadist of spectacular talent. The Happiest Man Alive has an entire central nervous system of its own. It's a Frankenstein's monster of an album, gruesome and miraculous, stitched together from what would appear to be fragments of a dozen different psyches lodged inside one head." - Melody Maker

Track listing
All tracks written and composed by Stephen Jones.

"Razorblade Shower" – 4:06
"Sundial in a Tunnel" – 2:52
"Little White Man" – 2:24
"Halfway Up the Hill" – 4:36
"Horsesugar" – 2:49
"Please Don't Be Famous" – 3:30
"Louise" – 2:31
"Seagullably" – 2:54
"Copper Feel" – 3:27
"Dead in Love" – 3:50
"Candy Girl" – 3:46
"Gunfingers" – 2:45
"Married" – 0:11
"I Took a Drug" – 4:56 (not listed on the CD)
"In the Country" – 2:47
"Planecrash Xmas" – 3:14
"This Beautiful Disease" – 4:08
"You'll Get a Slap" – 3:16
"In The Morning" – 2:12

Personnel
Stephen Jones – Instruments, Artwork
Colin Bradley – Tarted-Up-by
DED Associates – Artwork
D. Jones – Model

References

1996 albums
Babybird albums